Tbilisi National Park is one of nine national parks in Georgia, located in Mtskheta Municipality to the north of the city of Tbilisi. The historical town of Mtskheta lies right outside of the western boundary of the park. The national park was established in 1973 on the basis of the previously existing Saguramo National Reserve (established in 1946) and is the oldest national park in Georgia.

The park is located on the slope of the Saguramo Range, east of the Aragvi River, and belongs to the drainage basin of the Kura. The area of the park is mainly covered by trees and shrub of oak, hornbeam, and beech. The protected mammals in the park include red deer, lynx, Eurasian brown bear, red fox, and jackal.

The paved road connecting Tbilisi and Tianeti crosses the central part of the park, traversing the Saguramolalno Range. A stretch of the Tbilisi bypass highway runs along the southwestern border of the park.

Gallery

References

National parks of Georgia (country)
Protected areas established in 1973
Parks in Tbilisi